Pangu is the creator god in Chinese mythology.

Pangu may also refer to:

 Pangu, Nepal, village in Nepal
 Pangu utility, computer graphics utility
 Pangu Team, an iOS jailbreaking team
 Pangu Party, a political party in Papua New Guinea

China
 Pangu Township, Fujian (zh), subdivision of Yongtai County, Fujian
 Pangu Township, Hebei (zh), subdivision of Qing County, Hebei
 Pangu, Heilongjiang (zh), town in and subdivision of Tahe County, Heilongjiang
 Pangu Township, Henan (zh),  a township of Biyang County, Henan
 Pangu Township, Hunan (zh),  a township of Yuanling County, Hunan
 Pangu, Jiangxi (zh), town in and subdivision of Jishui County, Jiangxi

See also
 Ban Gu, Chinese historian